Chinnakorn Deesai is a retired professional footballer from Thailand.

Honor
Ubon UMT United

Regional League Division 2:
Winners : 2015
Regional League North-East Division
 Runner-up : 2015

External links
Profile at Thaipremierleague.co.th
https://int.soccerway.com/players/chinnakorn-deesai/474341/

Living people
Chinnakorn Deesai
1983 births
Chinnakorn Deesai
Association football goalkeepers
Chinnakorn Deesai